Abayomi Rotimi Mighty (born March 29, 1985) is Nigeria youth ambassador to the United Nations. Mighty is the current National Youth Leader of the Nigerian Intervention Movement (NIM) lead by Nigerian Human Right Activist Olisa Agbakoba. He is also a member of the National Steering Committee of the Coalition of United Political Parties (CUPP)

Career and politics
At age 17, He was the United Nations (UN) African Youth Spokesperson at the African Leaders Summit on HIV/AIDS that produced the Abuja Declaration (2001) His speech played a role in the establishment and success of 'Youth Involvement Revolution' of the 21st century in Africa.

Abayomi is a Public Speaker and has author a book titled 'Things for Teens' and 'The Thumb Revolution'. He has composed 1,217 songs and developed 987 stories ready to be told and scripted into films and novels also writing a book about Damola Victor Ayegbayo about his artistic life circle title ' Art is life'. He served as Project Manager of Adegrange Child Foundation an NGO founded by Nigeria's Former Minister of Health Prof. Adenike Grange

Abayomi is Nigeria youth ambassador to the United Nations. He is currently the National Youth Leader of the Nigerian Intervention Movement (NIM) lead by Olisa Agbakoba which has now formed Political alliance with People's Trust (PT) and he is also a member of the National Steering Committee of the Coalition of United Political Parties (CUPP).

Awards
Global New Leader for Tomorrow Award by Crans Montana Forum, Monaco.

References

Living people
Nigerian human rights activists
Nigerian activists
People from Ijebu Ode
1985 births